Stuchowo  (German Stuchow) is a village in the administrative district of Gmina Świerzno, within Kamień County, West Pomeranian Voivodeship, in north-western Poland.

See also 

 History of Pomerania

References

Stuchowo